Prudente José de Morais e Barros (4 October 1841 – 3 December 1902) was a Brazilian lawyer and politician who was the third president of Brazil. He is notable as the first civilian president of the country, the first to be elected by direct popular ballot under the permanent provisions of Brazil's 1891 Constitution, and the first to serve his term in its entirety. His presidency, which lasted from 15 November 1894 until 14 November 1898, was marked by the War of Canudos, a peasant revolt in the northeast of the country that was crushed by the Brazilian Army. He also had to face a break in diplomatic relations with Portugal that was successfully mediated by Queen Victoria of the United Kingdom.

Previously he had been the Governor of the State of São Paulo and President of the Senate from 1891 to 1894. He was also president of the Constituent Congress that drafted and approved Brazil's 1891 Constitution. The city of Presidente Prudente, located in the western part of the State of São Paulo, is named after him.

Training and early career 

Prudente de Morais was born in the vicinity of Itu, in the province of São Paulo, on 4 October 1841. His ancestry dated back to the early Portuguese settlers of Brazil. At the age of three he lost his father, an animal dealer, who was murdered by a slave. After his mother remarried, Morais took up residence in the city, where he finished primary school. He graduated with a law degree from the Law School of São Paulo in 1863 (today's Faculty of Law of the University of São Paulo) and moved to Piracicaba that same year. He practiced law there for two years and began his political career in 1865. He married Adelaide Benvinda da Silva Gordo in Piracicaba in 1866.

During the period of the Empire of Brazil, Morais belonged first to the Liberal Party as a monarchist. He was elected an alderman in 1865, presiding over the city of Piracicaba.

In 1873, he joined the Paulista Republican Party (PRP) and declared himself a republican as a representative in the Provincial Assembly.

He was a provincial deputy in the city of São Paulo and deputy to the General Assembly of the Empire as a supporter of the republican form of government, abolition of slavery and federalism. As provincial deputy, he worked with the complex issue of the borders of São Paulo with Minas Gerais, a subject on which he was an expert.

After the proclamation of the Republic in 1889, his Party began to dominate national politics, and Moraes was elected to the Constituent Congress as Senator for São Paulo. Due to his leading position in the Party, he was chosen by his peers as President of the Constituent Congress, that promulgated the Brazil's first republican Constitution in 1891.

Morais ran in the first Brazilian presidential election (conducted by the Constituent Congress after the promulgation of the Constitution and in accordance with its transitional provisions), but lost to incumbent Head of the Provisional Government Deodoro da Fonseca. After that election and the inauguration of the first President and Vice-President, the Congress's function as a Constituent Assembly ceased, and it became an ordinary bicameral National Congress, whereupon Morais' role as President of the Constituent Congress ended. Senator Prudente de Moraes was then elected Vice-President of the Federal Senate, the Legislature's upper house. The Presidency of the Senate was vested by the Constitution in the Vice-President of the Republic. In November 1891 however, President Deodoro da Fonseca attempted to dissolve Congress and rule as a dictator, but after a few weeks he was forced to resign the Presidency due to the First Revolt of the Navy; Vice-President Floriano Peixoto then succeeded to the Presidency of the Republic, and the Vice-Presidency became vacant and remained so until the next presidential election, in 1894. As a consequence, Morais, who until then was Vice-President of the Senate, succeeded Peixoto as President of the Senate on 23 November 1891.

As President of the Republic 

In the contest for the succession of Floriano Peixoto, Morais was nominated by the Republican Federal Party (Federal PR), founded by Paulo Glicerio Francisco in 1893. He won the presidential election on 1 March 1894 and took office on 15 November that year, becoming the first president of Brazil to be elected by direct vote and the first civilian president of Brazil. Prudente gleaned 276,583 votes against 38,291 for his main competitor, Afonso Pena. The election had more than 29 politicians polled. His vice-president was Dr. Manuel Vitorino Pereira. His election marked the coming to power of the coffee oligarchy of São Paulo (the "paulista oligarchy") in place of the military.

The four-year government of Prudente de Morais was shaken both by partisan political issues and continued fighting in Rio Grande do Sul, the center of the Federalist Revolt (1893–1895). Early in his government, he was able to resolve the latter difficulty by signing a peace treaty with the rebels, who received amnesty.

Later, Prudente de Morais devoted all of his efforts to pacify the policial factions within his country, which included extreme advocates of the centralist policies of Floriano Peixoto and supporters of the monarchy. During his rule, he abandoned the innovative measures of Floriano Peixoto one by one. A gradual approach was necessary since the Florianists still had some influence, particularly in the army, and the vice-president was connected to the ideas of the Florianists.

In 1896, he faced a diplomatic issue involving the British, who saw fit to take possession of the islands of Trindade and Martim Vaz in 1895, and the revolt of the Military School. He asserted his authority by closing the school and military club. The diplomatic issue was resolved favorably in favor of Brazil.

Prudente de Morais re-established relations with Portugal and signed a Treaty of Friendship with Japan in November 1895 with the aim of encouraging the arrival of Japanese immigrants.

But shortly after the rebel movement in Rio Grande do Sul, would face an even greater challenge: the War of Canudos in the interior of Bahia.

Forced to undergo surgery, Prudente de Morais retired from power between 10 November 1896 and 4 March 1897, turning over his responsibilities to Vice-President Vitorino. During this interim, Vitorino transferred the seat of government from Itamaraty Palace to the Catete Palace.

With the victory of the rebels of Antônio Conselheiro in the War of Canudos, the political situation further deteriorated. Prudente interrupted his convalescence and then appointed Minister of War general  to lead a new expedition to defeat the rebels.

Internal differences within the PR and the War of Canudos wore down the government. Even with the victory of the government troops in the war, tensions did not abate. On 5 November 1897, during a military ceremony, Morais withstood an assassination attempt. He escaped unhurt, but his war minister, Carlos Machado de Bittencourt, died defending him. The president decreed a state of siege, for the former Distrito Federal (1891–1960) in order to get rid of his most troublesome opponents.

The difficult economic and financial crisis inherited from the Encilhamento economic bubble took its toll on the administration, mainly because of military spending and increased debt to foreign creditors.

With the advice of his ministers of finance, Rodrigues Alves and Bernardino de Campos, Prudente negotiated with British bankers to consolidate debt in a  financial transaction known as funding loan, based on the policy implemented by Joaquim Murtinho within four years.

In foreign policy, a boundary dispute with Argentina arbitrated by U.S. President Grover Cleveland was resolved in favor of Brazil. Historians ascribe that diplomatic success to the efforts and diligence of the Brazilian Government's representative, the Baron of Rio Branco, appointed by Morais to lead the Brazilian delegation in the arbitration process.

References

External links

1841 births
1902 deaths
University of São Paulo alumni
Presidents of Brazil
Presidents of the Federal Senate (Brazil)
Governors of São Paulo (state)
Republican Party of São Paulo politicians
Federal Republican Party (Brazil) politicians
Liberal Party (Brazil) politicians
Brazilian people of Portuguese descent
Candidates for President of Brazil
Brazilian slave owners